Lema Mabidi (born 11 June 1993) is a Congolese professional footballer who last played as a midfielder for Iraqi club Al-Diwaniya FC.

Honours 
AS Vita Club:  
 CAF Champions League: Runner up 2014

Raja Casablanca
 Moroccan Throne Cup: 2017
 CAF Confederation Cup: 2018
 CAF Super Cup: 2019

National
DR Congo
Africa Cup of Nations Third Place: 2015

References

External links 
 
 Lema Mabidi at Footballdatabase

1993 births
Living people
Democratic Republic of the Congo footballers
Democratic Republic of the Congo expatriate footballers
Democratic Republic of the Congo international footballers
Association football midfielders
2015 Africa Cup of Nations players
AS Vita Club players
CS Sfaxien players
Raja CA players
Sabail FK players
Al-Quwa Al-Jawiya players
Azerbaijan Premier League players
Botola players
Tunisian Ligue Professionnelle 1 players
Democratic Republic of the Congo expatriate sportspeople in Tunisia
Democratic Republic of the Congo expatriate sportspeople in Morocco
Democratic Republic of the Congo expatriate sportspeople in Azerbaijan
Expatriate footballers in Tunisia
Expatriate footballers in Morocco
Expatriate footballers in Azerbaijan
Expatriate footballers in Iraq
21st-century Democratic Republic of the Congo people